Lin Hejie  (Lim Ho Kiat; ; pen name 林寉傑; born October 7, 1986) is a Chinese painter. In February 2019, he was hired by the Fujian Provincial Government Portal to become an online commentator.

Early life 

He came from a poor family, and in middle school his talent for art was discovered by his art teacher. His art teacher supported Lin Hejie's artistic development, but due to Lin Hejie failing in his other academic examinations, he gave up his dream of attending university. Due to his family's economic circumstances, Lin Hejie left school.

In 2003 he joined the People's Liberation Army Airborne Troops. After working with the airborne troops, he insisted on researching art theory.

Career 
Lin Hejie is a member of Xiamen City Artists Association, Fujian Province Artists Association, Since retiring from the airborne force in 2006, he has been a freelance artist in Xiamen.

His paintings are often related with his life experiences. Lin Hejie researched both Bada Shanren and the Lingnan School of Painting, reading on the subject and observing ancient paintings.

Lin's works often appear in China's comprehensive art exhibition, his works have appeared in the Beijing Chinese people's Revolutionary Military Museum, Hong Kong City Hall, Yinchuan International Convention and Exhibition Center, Museum of Xiamen City, Xiamen Art Gallery, Weihai City Public Art Center display.

Artistic creation 
Lin Hejie known for painting, ink painting, pottery and other forms. He also utilises hybrid ceramic art and Western painting techniques.

Gallery

See also 
List of Chinese painters

References

External links  
 Lin Hejie art network
Han and Tang classics, artists

1986 births
Living people
Painters from Fujian
Impressionist painters
People from Zhangzhou